Feliks Kojadinović (born June 12, 1979) is a Bosnian Serb former professional basketball player. He played the shooting guard position.

External links
 Feliks Kojadinović at eurobasket.com
 Feliks Kojadinović at adriaticbasket.com

1979 births
Living people
ABA League players
BBC Monthey players
BC Cherkaski Mavpy players
BC Samara players
Keravnos B.C. players
KK Borac Banja Luka players
KK Bosna Royal players
KK Vojvodina Srbijagas players
Maroussi B.C. players
P.A.O.K. BC players
People from Gradiška, Bosnia and Herzegovina
Shooting guards
Universiade bronze medalists for Serbia and Montenegro
Universiade medalists in basketball
Medalists at the 2005 Summer Universiade